In computers and technology, a postmaster is the administrator of a mail server. Nearly every domain should have the e-mail address postmaster@example.com where errors in e-mail processing are directed. Error e-mails automatically generated by mail servers' MTAs usually appear to have been sent to the postmaster address.

Every domain that supports the SMTP protocol for electronic mail is required by RFC 5321 and, as early as 1982, by RFC 822, to have the postmaster address. The rfc-ignorant.org website used to maintain a list of domains that do not comply with the RFC based on this requirement, but was shut down in November 2012.  The website RFC2 Realtime List expanded to include rfc-ignorant's lists after they shut down.

Quoting from the RFC:

Any system that includes an SMTP server supporting mail relaying or delivery MUST support the reserved mailbox "postmaster" as a case-insensitive local name.  This postmaster address is not strictly necessary if the server always returns 554 on connection opening (as described in section 3.1).  The requirement to accept mail for postmaster implies that RCPT commands which specify a mailbox for postmaster at any of the domains for which the SMTP server provides mail service, as well as the special case of "RCPT TO:<Postmaster>" (with no domain specification), MUST be supported.

SMTP systems are expected to make every reasonable effort to accept mail directed to Postmaster from any other system on the Internet. In extreme cases (such as to contain a denial of service attack or other breach of security) an SMTP server may block mail directed to Postmaster.  However, such arrangements SHOULD be narrowly tailored so as to avoid blocking messages which are not part of such attacks.

Since most domains have a postmaster address, it is commonly targeted by spamming operations. Even if not directly spammed, a postmaster address may be sent bounced spam from other servers that mistakenly trust fake return-paths commonly used in spam.

References

External links
 RFC 5321: The SMTP Protocol

Email